The women's javelin throw at the 2021 World Athletics U20 Championships was held at the Kasarani Stadium on 19 August.

Records

Results

Final
The final was held on 19 August at 14:40.

References

javelin throw
Javelin throw at the World Athletics U20 Championships
U20